Tillandsia abbreviata is a species in the genus Tillandsia. This species is native to Colombia.

References

abbreviata
Epiphytes